There's No Good in Goodbye is the ninth studio album by American vocal group, The Manhattans, released in 1978 through Columbia Records.

Reception
The album peaked at No. 18 on the R&B albums chart. It also reached No. 78 on the Billboard 200. The album features the singles "Am I Losing You", which peaked at No. 6 on the Hot Soul Singles chart, and "Everybody Has a Dream", which reached No. 65 on the same chart.

Track listing

Charts
Album

Singles

References

External links
 

1978 albums
The Manhattans albums
Albums produced by Bobby Martin
Albums arranged by Bobby Martin
Columbia Records albums
Albums recorded at Total Experience Recording Studios